Maciej Dziewoński (died May 31, 1794) was a Polish priest, noted for his opposition to the Kościuszko Uprising and his espionage for the Russians.

Dziewoński spoke openly against the uprising and had close ties to the number of Russian Army officers, primarily major Ignacy Parczewski, who dated his sister, Salomea.

Dziewoński informed the Russian military about the situation in the Polish camp.

After his espionage activity was uncovered, he was arrested on April 24, 1794. The court in Kraków found him guilty of high treason and sentenced him to death. After he was expelled from the church, Dziewoński was publicly beheaded by the sword in Kraków.

His sister was held in prison until the fall of the uprising. Later she married Praczewski.

18th-century births
1794 deaths
People executed by Poland by decapitation
18th-century Polish–Lithuanian Roman Catholic priests
Executed Polish people
People executed by the Polish–Lithuanian Commonwealth
People executed for treason against Poland